Ogea Driki (pronounced ) is a coral atoll covering approximately  in Fiji's Southern Lau Group.

A  area covering both Ogea Driki and Ogea Levu is the Ogea Important Bird Area. The Important Bird Area covers the entire range of the near threatened Ogea monarch.

It is the farming and fishing ground for the Ogean villagers who own the island and subdivided into farming lots as well as beaches. It has no residential house but are always used by the Ogeans as a place to sleep overnight for fishing purposes or any other means. It has a rich bundled fish corals and reef.

See also

 Desert island
 List of islands

References

Uninhabited islands of Fiji
Lau Islands
Important Bird Areas of Fiji